Stick Against Stone is a Post-punk / No Wave band from Pittsburgh, Pennsylvania; that later resided in Brooklyn, New York; Eugene, Oregon and San Francisco, California and remained active (in no less than six incarnations) between 1981 and 1990.  The group returned to performing in 2011 and currently resides in the New York City area.

Since their founding, the band went through several line-up changes, but never released a full album until 2010 – and it wasn't until the 2014 release of The Oregon Bootleg Tapes - Live (a live recording from 1985) that critical attention finally arrived in the form of positive reviews in New York Magazine, Vibe, Wax Poetics, Cuepoint (Robert Christgau) and Pitchfork, where writer Miles Raymer remarked about the group: “They had their eyes on the 'there and then', but they were playing 20 years into the future.”

Discography
Releases
 MediaGroove Music: 
 The Index of Directions - (MG-001 - 2010) (digital) 
 Live At Danny's Pub -  (MG-002 - 2012) (digital) 
 Get It All Out (as Stick Against Stone Orchestra) - (MG-003 - 2013) (CD, LP & digital)
 The Oregon Bootleg Tapes - LIVE - (MG-004 - 2014) (CD, digital) 
 Leonard / The Hopping Frog (MG-005 - 2014) (7" vinyl single) 
 INSTANT  (MG-006 - 2015) (CD, digital)
 The Rippel Tapes  (MG-008 - 2018) (digital)
 Eponymous 4 song cassette - released on their own label (SAS - 1985).
 T.M.I. Records: 
 Body Motion - (TMI-015 - 1982) (1 track on a vinyl compilation LP)

References

External links
 
 Official Discogs page
 Official Bandcamp page
 Official Setlist.fm page
 Official Musicbrainz page

Other links 
 Press reviews of "The Oregon Bootleg Tapes"
 Pittsburgh Music History (1980s) site on Yahoo! Groups
 Panic 13 (Eugene, OR '80s Music History site) on Yahoo! Groups
 Gigposters.com - Concert Posters of Stick Against Stone from Pittsburgh-area shows and the Rock Against Reagan tour show in Los Angeles, CA
 "Re-Punk Throwdown" - article in Pittsburgh Post-Gazette on the August 2006 reunion concerts of Pittsburgh-area Punk, Post-punk, New Wave and Rock bands from the 80s.
 Yinzer.net - : Collection of Pittsburgh, PA Punk, Post-punk, New Wave and Rock bands from the years 1978-1986
 David Soule (bass player and songwriter in group)

American post-punk music groups
No wave groups
Musical groups from Pittsburgh
Musical groups from Pennsylvania
Musical groups from Brooklyn
Musical groups from Eugene, Oregon
Musical groups from San Francisco
Musical groups established in 1981